Francisco Conceição Alves Correia Oliveira, known as Chico Oliveira (27 January 1964 – 1 October 2006) was a Portuguese football player.

Club career
He played 7 seasons and 176 games in the Primeira Liga for Paços de Ferreira, Marítimo, Chaves, Salgueiros and Estrela Amadora.

Honours
Estrela Amadora
Taça de Portugal: 1989–90

References

External links
 

1964 births
2006 deaths
Sportspeople from Maputo
Portuguese footballers
G.D. Estoril Praia players
Liga Portugal 2 players
F.C. Famalicão players
C.F. Estrela da Amadora players
Primeira Liga players
C.S. Marítimo players
F.C. Paços de Ferreira players
S.C. Salgueiros players
G.D. Chaves players
F.C. Felgueiras players
C.D. Feirense players
Ermesinde S.C. players
S.C. Lamego players
G.D. Joane players
Association football defenders